Liêu Hữu Phương (Chữ Hán: 廖有方; Chinese pinyin: Liao Youfang; Wade–Giles: Liao Yu-fang), Chinese name Liao Yuqīng (fl. 9th century), was an poet and government official of the Tang dynasty during the early 9th century AD.

Biography
Liêu Hữu Phương was of Vietnamese ethnicity. He was born in Jiao prefecture (modern-day Hanoi), Protectorate General to Pacify the South, when Vietnam was part of the Tang dynasty. Little was known about his life.

The Tang imperial system did allow for some promotion by merit and could even be strikingly trans-ethnic. At this time, however Confucianism ideas had very little impacts on the indigenous people of north Vietnam. A Tang official wrote dismissively in 845: "Annan has produced no more than eight imperial officials; senior graduates have not exceeded ten."

In 815, Liêu Hữu Phương took a 1,450-miles journal from Hanoi to Chang'an, capital of the Tang dynasty to take the Tang imperial examination, but he failed. He then took a trip to Shu, modern-day Sichuan Province to visit a fellow student. In the next year, he participated in the civil service examination again and passed it. He was appointed as a librarian at the imperial court.

His poems most now are lost; his On a Stranger’s Coffin: A Poem Engraved on the Occasion of Burying a Scholar at Baoqe in Quan Tang Shi is the only preserved one and the oldest extant poem written in Chinese by a Vietnamese.

See also
 Jiang Gongfu (731–805), a Chinese poet born in Annan

References

Works cited 

 

9th-century Chinese poets
9th-century Vietnamese poets
People from Hanoi